Penelope Trevor (born 1960) professionally known as Pepe Trevor, is an Australian actress, screenwriter, journalist and author and visual artist, who is perhaps best known for her role as young card sharp and trouble-maker, Lexie Patterson in Prisoner (1985–86).

Biography
Trevor was born in Sydney, and moved to Melbourne at the age of six. She made a name as an actress in various Australian television series during the 1980s. Later in life, Trevor began writing, and won the Dobbie Award in the 1997 Nita Kibble Literary Awards for her first novel, Listening for Small Sounds. Her second novel, Another Man's Office, came out in 2000. As a journalist, Trevor has contributed articles for The Melbourne Weekly Magazine. Trevor was married to violinist and music teacher, Matthew Arnold, and has two sons, Jaspar and Tashi. She is the daughter of TV producer Marie Trevor (born Brisbane, Queensland 1922 - 7 June 2000, Australia), who also worked on  Prisoner

She was portrayed on film by Sarah Snook in Holding The Man, a 2015 release based on her lifelong friend Timothy Conigrave's memoir of the same name.

Bibliography
 Listening for Small Sounds. (1996)
 Another Man's Office. (2000)

Filmography

External links
 
 Pepe Trevor talks about her dental problems

References

1960s births
Australian journalists
Australian women novelists
Australian film actresses
Australian soap opera actresses
Living people
20th-century Australian actresses
21st-century Australian actresses